Predlitz-Turrach is a former municipality in the district of Murau in Styria, Austria. Since the 2015 Styria municipal structural reform, it is part of the municipality Stadl-Predlitz.

Geography
The municipality lies in the upper valley of the Mur in the Gurktal Alps.

References

Cities and towns in Murau District